Ray Whitley may refer to:

Ray Whitley (singer-songwriter) (1901–1979), American country singer and actor
Ray Whitley (songwriter) (1943–2013), American beach music composer and singer-songwriter

See also
Whitley (surname)